Rhyssemus is a genus of aphodiine dung beetles in the family Scarabaeidae. There are more than 160 described species in Rhyssemus.

See also
 List of Rhyssemus species

References

Further reading

External links

 

Scarabaeidae
Articles created by Qbugbot